is a Japanese writer and artist. She has won the Oda Sakunosuke Prize, the Kawai Hayao Literary Prize, and the Naoki Prize, and several of her books have been adapted for film.

Early life and education 
Kanako Nishi was born in Tehran, Iran on May 7, 1977. Her family moved back to Japan at age 2, but her father's job took them away from Japan again to Cairo, Egypt when she was 7 years old. The Nishi family stayed in Cairo for four years, then returned to Izumi, Osaka. She later drew on this experience in creating the main character in her bestselling novel Saraba! Nishi attended junior high and high school in Izumi municipal schools. After high school, she attended Kansai University in Osaka.

Career 
At age 26, Nishi lied to her parents about getting a job in Tokyo, and left Osaka to pursue her dream of writing professionally. Her first book, the short story collection , was published in 2004. She has since published over 20 books, including novels, essay collections, short story collections, and illustrated children's books. 

In 2006, Nishi's novel  won the Oda Sakunosuke Prize, which is named for the Buraiha writer Sakunosuke Oda. That same year Kanako's novel , a story about a long-married couple who receive a mysterious letter that leads them to revisit the history of their relationship, was published by Shogakukan. It was later adapted into the 2013 film Kiiroi Zou, starring Aoi Miyazaki and Osamu Mukai. In 2011 her novel , about the daily life of an elementary school girl who prefers to be alone, was published by Bungeishunjū. It was later adapted into a 2014 Isao Yukisada film starring Mana Ashida and Ryuhei Maruyama. Nishi's 2012 novel Fukuwarai (lit. "Funny Face"), about the relationships between an eccentric editor and the people around her, won the inaugural Kawai Hayao story prize, drawing praise from prize judge and novelist Nahoko Uehashi.

Nishi won the 152nd Naoki Prize in 2015 for her novel , which drew heavily on her childhood experiences in its portrayal of a male protagonist born in Iran who overcomes hardships while moving between Egypt and Japan. Saraba! drew particular praise from the committee members for its unorthodox style and language. Later that year Vogue Japan named Nishi one of its 2015 Women of the Year. In 2016 her novel , about an elementary school boy whose friendship with a new transfer student leads to his discovery of a big secret, was published by Fukuinkan Shoten. The novel was adapted into a 2019 film for Nikkatsu by screenwriter and director Keiko Tsuruoka, with Hikaru Yamazaki and Ninon in the lead roles.

In 2020, Kanako's previously published stories "Sam no Koto" (lit. "Sam") and "Saru ni Au" (lit. "Meet the Monkey") were adapted into a two-part television series for subscription channel dTV, with the main characters played by fourth generation members of idol group Nogizaka46. A new volume containing the adapted stories was scheduled for publication by Shogakukan in March 2020, prior to the show's premiere. That same year, director Hitoshi Yazaki adapted Nishi's novel Sakura, which had sold more than 500,000 copies since its publication in 2005, into a film starring Nana Komatsu, Takumi Kitamura, and Ryo Yoshizawa.

Writing style

Nishi's characters frequently use Osaka-ben, the distinctive Japanese dialect common in Osaka and surrounding cities. She often writes words in hiragana rather than kanji to allow multiple interpretations, and for aesthetic effect. Her English translator, Allison Markin Powell, has said that Nishi's writing is "deceptively simple yet beautiful", and that it "establishes an immediate intimacy with her characters." Her work addresses issues in "religion, individualism, and society", especially during times of upheaval and disaster.

Personal life 
Nishi started reading The Bluest Eye by Toni Morrison as a first-year high school student and has preferred reading foreign authors ever since. Her favorite author is Chimamanda Ngozi Adichie. Nishi is a fan of professional wrestling, particularly New Japan Pro-Wrestling.

Recognition 

 2006: Oda Sakunosuke Prize for 
 2012: Kawai Hayao Literary Prize for 
 2015: 152nd Naoki Prize (2014下) for

Adaptations

Film 
 Kiiroi Zou (Yellow Elephant), 2013
 Entaku: Kokko, Hitonatsu no Imagine (Round Table), 2014
 Makuko, 2019
 Sakura, 2020
 Fortune Favors Lady Nikuko, 2021

Television 
 Sam no Koto/Saru ni Au, dTV, 2020

Works

Books in Japanese

Fiction 
 Aoi, Shogakukan, 2004, 
 Sakura, Shogakukan, 2005, 
 Kiiroi zou, Shogakukan, 2006, 
 Tsūtenkaku, Chikuma Shobo, 2006, 
 Shizuku, Kobunsha, 2007, 
 Koufuku midori no, Shogakukan, 2008, 
 Mado no sakana, Shinchosha, 2008, 
 Utsukushii hito, Gentosha, 2009, 
 Kiriko ni tsuite, Kadokawa, 2009, 
 Enjō suru kimi, Kadokawa, 2010, 
 Shiroi shirushi, Shinchosha, 2010, 
 Entaku, Bungeishunju, 2011, 
 Fortune Favors Lady Nikuko, Gentosha, 2011, 
 Chika no hato, Bungeishunju, 2011, 
 Fukuwarai, Asahi Shimbun, 2012, 
 Furu, Kawade Shobo Shinsha, 2012, 
 Butai, Kodansha, 2014, 
 Saraba!, Shogakukan, 2014,  (vol. 1)  (vol. 2)
 Makuko, Fukuinkan Shoten, 2016, 
 i, Popurasha, 2016, 
 Omajinai, Chikuma Shobo, 2018, 
 Sam no Koto, Saru ni Au, Shogakukan, 2020,

Illustrated books 

 Medama to yagi, LD&K Books, 2012, 
 Kimi wa umi, Switch Library, 2015,

Nonfiction 
 Mikkī kashimashi, Chikuma Shobo, 2007, 
 Mikkī takumashi, Chikuma Shobo, 2009, 
 Gohan gururi, NHK Publishing, 2013, 
 Manimani, Kadokawa, 2015,

Selected work in translation 

 "Merry Christmas," English trans. Allison Markin Powell, fiftystorms.org
"Fear of Manners," English trans. Allison Markin Powell, Words Without Borders, May 2017 issue.
"Burn," English trans. Allison Markin Powell, Freeman's: Power, Fall 2018 issue.

References 

Living people
1977 births
Japanese women novelists
21st-century Japanese women writers
Kansai University alumni
People from Izumi, Osaka
Writers from Osaka Prefecture
People from Tehran
Naoki Prize winners